Trangie is a closed railway station on the Main Western railway line in New South Wales, Australia. The station opened in 1883, initially as a passing loop and siding, the only one between Narromine and Nevertire. It was named after Trangie Station, a local pastoral holding. The station consists of a side platform and station building which survives in good condition.

References

Disused regional railway stations in New South Wales
Railway stations in Australia opened in 1883
Main Western railway line, New South Wales